Andrzej Bartkiewicz (born 24 October 1991) is a Polish cyclist, who last rode for UCI Continental team .

Major results
2007
 1st Time trial, European Youth Olympic Festival
2009
 1st  Junior race, National Cyclo-cross Championships
2012
 2nd Memoriał Andrzeja Trochanowskiego
2013
 1st  Individual pursuit, National Track Championships
2014
 1st Stage 2 Bałtyk–Karkonosze Tour
2017
 4th Memorial Grundmanna I Wizowskiego
2018
 6th Memoriał Andrzeja Trochanowskiego

References

External links

1991 births
Living people
Polish male cyclists
Place of birth missing (living people)